Bishop Mykhaylo Bubniy, C.Ss.R. (born 16 September 1970 in Khlivchany, Sokal Raion, Lviv Oblast, Ukrainian SSR) is a Ukrainian Greek Catholic hierarch as an Archiepiscopal Exarch of Ukrainian Catholic Archiepiscopal Exarchate of Odessa, Archiepiscopal Administrator of Ukrainian Catholic Archiepiscopal Exarchate of Krym and Titular Bishop of Thubursicum-Bure since 2 April 2014.

Life
Bishop Bubniy was born in the family of Ivan Bubniy in Sokal Raion, where he grew up. After graduation of the school education, he joined the Congregation of the Most Holy Redeemer in 1991.

In the Congregation he made a profession on 19 August 1992 and a solemn profession on 7 April 1996. Bubniy was ordained as priest on 19 August 1997, after completed philosophical and theological studies in the Major Redemptorists Theological Seminary in Tuchów, Poland and Pontifical Theological Academy in Kraków, Poland.

After returning from studies in Poland, he had a various pastoral assignments and served as professor, superior and finally, as a Rector of the Major Theological Redemptorists Institute in Lviv, Ukraine from 2005 until 2007, and then continued his studies in the Pontifical Oriental Institute in Rome with a Licentiate of the Canon Law degree.

On 13 February 2014 Fr. Bubniy was appointed and on 7 April 2014 was consecrated to the Episcopate as the second Archiepiscopal Exarch of the Ukrainian Catholic Archiepiscopal Exarchate of Odessa and the Titular Bishop of Thubursicum-Bure. In the same time he was appointed as an Archiepiscopal Administrator of the new created Ukrainian Catholic Archiepiscopal Exarchate of Krym. The principal consecrator was Sviatoslav Shevchuk, the Head of the Ukrainian Greek Catholic Church.

References

1970 births
Living people
People from Lviv Oblast
Redemptorists
Redemptorist bishops
Ukrainian Eastern Catholics
Pontifical Oriental Institute alumni
Academic staff of the Pontifical Oriental Institute
Canonical theologians
21st-century Eastern Catholic bishops
Bishops of the Ukrainian Greek Catholic Church